EFI may refer to:

People

Given name 
 Efi Arazi (1937–2013), Israeli businessman and high-tech entrepreneur
 Efi Foufoula-Georgiou (born 1957), Greek-American environmental engineer
 Efi Oshaya (born 1956), Israeli politician
 Efi Thodi (born 1934), Greek singer

Surname 
 Andrey Efi (born 1960), Russian artist
 Tufuga Efi (born 1937), Samoan politician

Technology
 Electronic fuel injection
 Exploding foil initiator
 Extensible Firmware Interface, a computer firmware standard
 EFI system partition

Other uses 
 École Française d'Islamabad, a French international school in Pakistan
 EFI Automotive, a French automotive company
 Efik language
 Electronics for Imaging, an American digital printing company
 Enrico Fermi Institute, at the University of Chicago
 Enterprise Florida, an American economic development organization
 Environmentalist Foundation of India, a wildlife conservation group
 Enzyme Function Initiative, a computational biology project
 Equestrian Federation of India
 Equestrian Federation of Ireland, now Horse Sport Ireland
 European Federation for Immunogenetics, a scientific society
 European Forest Institute, an international organisation
 European Friends of Israel, a political organization
 Evangelical Friends International, a Christian religious organization
 Expeditionary Forces Institute, of the British Navy, Army and Air Force Institutes

See also 
 Effie